The seal of Madagascar (French: Sceau de Madagascar) includes an outline map of the island at the center (together with two smaller islands nearby-the Glorioso Islands and Tromelin Island), and below it the head of a zebu. Colors used are red, green, yellow, black, and white. Green and red rays emanate from the map, making it look like the sun and also the Ravenala, a plant typical of Madagascar.

The device is surrounded by the Malagasy words REPOBLIKAN'I MADAGASIKARA which means "Republic of Madagascar" and at the base TANINDRAZANA - FAHAFAHANA - FANDROSOANA meaning "Homeland - Liberty - Development". Various versions of the Constitution Article 4 have used other mottos.

Gallery

External links 
 FOTW page about Madagascar's coat of arms
 National Arms and Emblems Past and Present
 Annex of the constitution

National symbols of Madagascar
Madagascar
Madagascar
Madagascar
Madagascar
Madagascar